Nifurtimox/eflornithine is a combination of two antiparasitic drugs, nifurtimox and eflornithine, used in the treatment of African trypanosomiasis (sleeping sickness). It is included in the World Health Organization's Model List of Essential Medicines.

A treatment regimen known as nifurtimox-eflornithine combination treatment (NECT) is used in second stage gambiense African trypanosomiasis throughout Africa where the disease is endemic.  The regimen involves slow infusion of 400 mg of eflornithine every 12 hours for 7 days combined with 15 mg/kg of nifurtimox orally three times a day for 10 days.

References 

Antiparasitic agents